Sergei Vladimirovich Pavlovich (born 13 May 1992) is a Russian professional mixed martial artist. He was the former Fight Nights Global heavyweight champion and currently competes in the Heavyweight division in the Ultimate Fighting Championship (UFC). As of December 6, 2022, he is #3 in the UFC heavyweight rankings.

Background
Sergei was born in 1992 in the village of Orlovsky, Rostov Oblast. At the age of 5, Pavlovich began to engage in Greco-Roman wrestling under the guidance of coach Alexander Fedorovich Aloyan. He was engaged in wrestling until the 11th grade. After serving in the army, he began to engage in army hand-to-hand fighting and combat sambo.

Mixed martial arts career

Fight Nights Global
Pavlovich started his professional MMA career in 2014 under the Fight Nights Global promotion, under which he won 12 fights without suffering a single defeat. On June 2, 2017, in a fight against Mikhail Mokhnatkin, he won the heavyweight title by unanimous decision. On November 19, 2017, he defended his heavyweight title in a fight against Kirill Sidelnikov.

Ultimate Fighting Championship
Pavlovich made his UFC debut on 24 November 2018 at UFC Fight Night 141 against Alistair Overeem. He lost the fight via TKO in the first round.

Pavlovich faced Marcelo Golm on April 20, 2019, at UFC Fight Night: Overeem vs. Oleinik. He won the fight via knockout. This win earned Performance of the Night award.

Pavlovich faced Maurice Greene on October 26, 2019, at UFC Fight Night 162. He won the fight via knockout in the first round.

Pavlovich was expected to face Ciryl Gane on August 8, 2020, at UFC Fight Night 174. Pavlovich however had to pull out because of an injury.

Pavlovich was expected to face Tom Aspinall on September 4, 2021, at UFC Fight Night 191.  However, Pavlovich pulled out a week before the contest due to visa issues and was replaced by Sergey Spivak.

Pavlovich was scheduled to face Tanner Boser on December 4, 2021 at UFC on ESPN 31. However due to travel issues, the bout was scrapped.

Pavlovich faced Shamil Abdurakhimov on March 19, 2022 at UFC Fight Night 204. He won the fight via technical knockout in round one. With this win, he received the Performance of the Night award.

Pavlovich fought Derrick Lewis on July 30, 2022 at UFC 277. He won the fight via TKO under a minute into the first round, though controversy arose as the stoppage by the referee was considered premature by fighters and fans alike.

Pavlovich faced Tai Tuivasa on December 3, 2022, at UFC on ESPN 42. He won the fight via KO under a minute into the first round. With this win, he received the Performance of the Night award.

Pavlovich is scheduled to face Curtis Blaydes on April 22, 2023, at UFC Fight Night 222.

Championships and accomplishments

Mixed martial arts
Ultimate Fighting Championship
 Performance of the Night (Three times) 
Fight Nights Global
Fight Nights Global Heavyweight Champion (One time) 
One successful title defense
MMAjunkie.com
2022 December Knockout of the Month

Personal info 
Pavlovich is considered to be the MMA fighter with the largest Ape index, of +9.0".

Mixed martial arts record

|-
|Win
|align=center|17–1
|Tai Tuivasa
|KO (punches)
|UFC on ESPN: Thompson vs. Holland
|
|align=center|1
|align=center|0:54
|Orlando, Florida, United States
|
|-
|Win
|align=center|16–1
|Derrick Lewis
|TKO (punches)
|UFC 277
|
|align=center|1
|align=center|0:55
|Dallas, Texas, United States
|
|-
|Win
|align=center|15–1
|Shamil Abdurakhimov
|TKO (punches)
|UFC Fight Night: Volkov vs. Aspinall
|
|align=center|1
|align=center|4:03
|London, England
|
|-
|Win
|align=center|14–1
|Maurice Greene
|TKO (punches)
|UFC Fight Night: Maia vs. Askren 
|
|align=center|1
|align=center|2:11
|Kallang, Singapore
| 
|-
|Win
|align=center|13–1
|Marcelo Golm
|KO (punch)
|UFC Fight Night: Overeem vs. Oleinik
|
|align=center|1
|align=center|1:06
|Saint Petersburg, Russia
|
|-
|Loss
|align=center|12–1
|Alistair Overeem
|TKO (punches)
|UFC Fight Night: Blaydes vs. Ngannou 2
|
|align=center|1
|align=center|4:21
|Beijing, China
|
|-
|Win
|align=center|12–0
|Kirill Sidelnikov
|TKO (punches)
|Fight Nights Global 79
|
|align=center|1
|align=center|2:45
|Penza, Russia
||

|-
|Win
|align=center|11–0
|Mikhail Mokhnatkin
|Decision (unanimous)
|Fight Nights Global 68
|
|align=center|5
|align=center|5:00
|Saint Petersburg, Russia
|
|-
|Win
|align=center|10–0
|Alexei Kudin
|Decision (unanimous)
|Fight Nights Global 54
|
|align=center|3
|align=center|5:00
|Saint Petersburg, Russia
|
|-
|Win
|align=center|9–0
|Akhmedshaikh Gelegaev
|TKO (knee and punches)
|Fight Nights Global 51
|
|align=center|1
|align=center|3:35
|Kaspiysk, Russia
|
|-
|Win
|align=center|8–0
|Chaban Ka
|TKO (punches)
|Fight Nights Global 50
|
|align=center|1
|align=center|1:54
|Saint Petersburg, Russia
|
|-
|Win
|align=center|7–0
|Magomedbag Agaev
|Decision (unanimous)
|Fight Nights Global 46
|
|align=center|3
|align=center|5:00
|Moscow, Russia
|
|-
|Win
|align=center|6–0
|Ruben Wolf
|TKO (punches)
|EFN: Fight Nights Moscow
|
|align=center|1
|align=center|2:02
|Moscow, Russia
|
|-
|Win
|align=center|5–0
|Sultan Murtazaliev
|TKO (punches)
|EFN: Fight Nights Dagestan
|
|align=center|1
|align=center|0:59
|Kaspiysk, Russia
|
|-
|Win
|align=center|4–0
|Vladimir Daineko
|KO (punch)
|Fight Nights: Sochi
|
|align=center|1
|align=center|0:24
|Sochi, Russia
|
|-
|Win
|align=center|3–0
|Ilja Škondrič
|TKO (punches)
|Full Fight 1: Slovakia and Czech vs. Russia
|
|align=center|1
|align=center|1:15
|Banská Bystrica, Slovakia
|
|-
|Win
|align=center|2–0
|Sergey Buinachev
|TKO (punches)
|Fight Nights: Cup of Moscow
|
|align=center|1
|align=center|0:20
|Moscow, Russia
|
|-
|Win
|align=center|1–0
|Alexander Derevyanko
|TKO (punches)
|Fight Nights: Battle of Moscow 18
|
|align=center|1
|align=center|3:52
|Moscow, Russia
|
|-

See also
List of current UFC fighters
List of male mixed martial artists

References

External links
 
 

1992 births
Heavyweight mixed martial artists
Mixed martial artists utilizing ARB
Mixed martial artists utilizing sambo
Living people
Russian male mixed martial artists
Ultimate Fighting Championship male fighters
Russian sambo practitioners
People from Rostov Oblast
Sportspeople from Rostov Oblast